The 2016–17 Süper Lig (known as the Spor Toto Süper Lig for sponsorship reasons) was the 59th season of the Süper Lig, the highest tier football league of Turkey.

The season was named after Turgay Şeren, a legendary goalkeeper of the Turkish national team who also played for and coached Galatasaray.

Teams
Adanaspor, Karabükspor and Alanyaspor achieved promotion from 2015–16 TFF First League. Karabükspor made an immediate return, whereas Adanaspor returned to the top level after 12 years in lower leagues. Finally Alanyaspor defeated Adana Demirspor in the play-off final for a debut season at top flight level. Also, for the first time Antalya Province will have 2 teams in Süper Lig.
Sivasspor, Eskişehirspor and Mersin İdman Yurdu were relegated to 2016–17 TFF First League. Sivasspor ended an 11-year stint in the top level, while Eskişehirspor and Mersin İdmanyurdu were relegated after 8 years and 2 years in the top flight, respectively.

Stadia and locations

Personnel and sponsorship

Managerial changes

League table

Results

Positions by round
The following table represents the teams' positions after each round in the competition.

Results by round
The following table represents the teams game results in each round.

Statistics

Top goalscorers

Top assists

Hat-tricks

Clean sheets

Player

Club

Attendances

These are the average attendances of all the top division teams.

See also
 2016–17 Turkish Cup
 2016–17 TFF First League
 2016–17 TFF Second League
 2016–17 TFF Third League

References

External links
 

2016-17
Turk
1